is an athlete from Japan.  She competes in the triathlon.

Hosoya competed at the first Olympic triathlon at the 2000 Summer Olympics.  She did not finish the competition.

References

1973 births
Living people
Japanese female triathletes
Olympic triathletes of Japan
Triathletes at the 2000 Summer Olympics
20th-century Japanese women
21st-century Japanese women